Gheorghe Florescu (born 18 February 1928) is a Romanian former sports shooter. He competed at the 1968 Summer Olympics and the 1972 Summer Olympics.

References

External links
 

1928 births
Possibly living people
Romanian male sport shooters
Olympic shooters of Romania
Shooters at the 1968 Summer Olympics
Shooters at the 1972 Summer Olympics
Sportspeople from Craiova
20th-century Romanian people